Cronin is derived from the Irish surname Ó Cróinín which originated in County Cork, and the Old Irish word crón, meaning saffron-colored. The Cronin family have been prominent in politics and the arts in Ireland, the United States, Australia and the United Kingdom since the nineteenth century.

Notable people with the surname include: 
 Alison Cronin, director of Monkey World
 A. J. Cronin (1896–1981), Scottish novelist
 A. L. Cronin (1902–1974), American lawyer and politician
 Anthony Cronin (1928–2016), Irish poet
 Barth S. Cronin (1858–1933), American politician from New York
 Bernard Cronin (1884–1968), Australian author and journalist
 Breeda Moynihan-Cronin (born 1953), Irish politician
 Brendan Cronin (disambiguation), several people
 Colton Cronin, Distinguished scholar of law and economics from Vanderbilt University
 Cornelius Cronin (1838–1912), Medal of Honor recipient during the American Civil War
 Daniel Cronin (born 1959), American politician from Illinois
 Daniel Anthony Cronin (born 1927), Archbishop of Hartford
 David Edward Cronin (1839–1925), American painter
 Deverick John Cronin (1911–1979), Australian football player and commentator
 Glenn Cronin (born 1981), Irish football player
 Gráinne Cronin (born 1953), Irish airline pilot
 Helena Cronin, English philosopher
 Henry Cronin (1894–1977), British civil engineer and army officer
 J. Wilmer Cronin (1896–1982), American politician and lawyer
 Jack Cronin (American football) (1903–1993), American football player
 James Cronin (1931–2016), American nuclear physicist
 Jeremy Cronin (born 1949), South African politician
 Jerry Cronin (1925–1990), Irish politician
 Jim Cronin (disambiguation), several people
 Joe Cronin (1906–1984), American baseball player
 John Cronin (disambiguation), several people
 John Francis Cronin (1908–1994), American priest
 Justin Cronin, American author
 Justin Cronin (politician) (1980–2020), American politician
 Keith Cronin (born 1986), Irish rally driver
 Kevin Cronin (born 1951), lead singer of REO Speedwagon
 Lance Cronin (born 1985), English football player
 Lee Cronin (disambiguation), several people
 Leroy Cronin (born 1973), British chemist
 Marcus Daniel Cronin (1865–1936), American military officer
 Michael Cronin (actor) (born 1942), English actor and writer
 Michael Cronin (academic) (born 1960), Irish academic and author
 Mick Cronin (basketball) (born 1971), American basketball coach
 Mikal Cronin (born 1985), American singer-songwriter
 Patrick Henry Cronin (1846–1889), American physician, murder victim
 Paul Cronin (1938–2019), Australian actor and owner of the Brisbane Bears
 Paul Cronin (judge), Australian judge
 Paul D. Cronin, American horseman, riding instructor and author
 Paul W. Cronin (1938–1997), American politician from Massachusetts
 Peter Cronin (born 1947), Australian Test cricket umpire
 R. F. Patrick Cronin (1926–2007), academic and healthcare consultant
 Rich Cronin (1975–2010), American singer and songwriter
 Sam Cronin (born 1986), American soccer player
 Seán Cronin, Chief of Staff of the IRA
 Seán Cronin (rugby union), Irish rugby player
 Shawn Cronin (born 1963), American ice hockey player
 Steve Cronin (born 1983), American soccer player
 Thomas Cronin (disambiguation), multiple people
 Vincent Cronin (1924–2011), British historical writer

See also
Cronan (surname)

Anglicised Irish-language surnames